"Think Twice" is a song recorded by Canadian singer Celine Dion, released as the third single from her third English-language album, The Colour of My Love (1993) in North America in July 1994, in the United Kingdom, Australia and Japan in October 1994, and in other European countries in 1995. It was written by Andy Hill and Peter Sinfield, and produced by Christopher Neil and Aldo Nova. In this rock-influenced song with a guitar solo, the protagonist is telling her lover to "think twice" before leaving her. The song became one of Dion's most successful hits in Europe and Australia, topping multiple charts, including those of Flemish Belgium, Ireland, the Netherlands, Norway, Sweden, and the United Kingdom. Remaining at the top of the UK Singles Chart for seven weeks, it eventually became the fourth single by a female artist to sell in excess of one million copies in the UK.

Background
Writer Andy Hill was known for his association with Bucks Fizz and Peter Sinfield was a former member of the rock group King Crimson. Two versions of the music video exist: the first was released in August 1994; later because of the huge success in the UK, Dion made a special music video in December 1994. It aired in the UK Top of the Pops television programme. The UK music video was directed by Randee St. Nicholas. The model of the first version of the Think Twice's video is Steve Santagati.

The B-sides of this single were taken mainly from Dion chante Plamondon album, which was released at that time worldwide. It was also the first time that Dion's English single included French songs as B-sides all over the world. Think Twice was included later on the European and Australian editions of All the Way... A Decade of Song greatest hits (1999) and European edition of My Love: Essential Collection (2008). It remains a staple of Dion's live set in countries where the song was a runaway hit. Dion performed "Think Twice" at the 1995 World Music Awards. "Think Twice" received an Ivor Novello Award for the Best Song Musically and Lyrically in 1995.

Critical reception
Thom Duffy from Billboard ranked "Think Twice" as the 8th best song of 1995 saying: “more genuine than by a score of other pop divas.” AllMusic senior editor Stephen Thomas Erlewine wrote in his review of the album, that there was "careful production, professional songwriting (highlighted by "When I Fall in Love", "The Power of Love", and "Think Twice".) Chicago Tribune senior Brad Webber wrote a mixed review, referring to Dion's vocals as "forcefully resonant and multiflavored". He elaborated, "On The Colour of My Love you've got to dig deep to find them, though, past the crooked roots of a Janet Jackson impersonation ('Misled' and 'Think Twice.') With her attempt at soul, you can categorize Dion as fairly shallow, sort of a female Michael Bolton". Tom Ewing from Freaky Trigger said that Dion "with a sharp, keening edge to her voice, [are] picking her words with care as she treads delicately through the song". 

Dave Sholin from the Gavin Report wrote, "By now there's little reason not to assume that Dion's remarkable vocal skill could turn "Whomp! There It Is" into an emotional masterpiece. However, her talents are much better utilized on this riveting ballad about a couple on the brink of ending a relationship". Dennis Hunt from LA Times compared Dion to singers like Mariah Carey and Whitney Houston. He noted "that grandiose, note-stretching finish" on the song. Pan-European magazine Music & Media opined that Dion "interprets [the song] like a female Aaron Neville". Alan Jones from Music Week deemed it "a ponderous power ballad, over earnest and over sung". John Kilgo from The Network Forty called it "another classic ballad". Christopher Smith from TalkAboutPopMusic described it as a "seemingly tender love song that then explodes into a power ballad".

Commercial performance
Upon its release, "Think Twice" became a hit in Europe and Australia. Uniquely for Dion's discography, whilst the song was not a major hit in America, it was a runaway hit in the United Kingdom, going on to be one of the biggest-selling records of all time. It remains Dion's second-biggest hit in the UK, eclipsed only by "My Heart Will Go On".

It became the fifth best selling single of 1995 in the United Kingdom, selling 696,000 copies that year alone. On top of that, it was the most successful song of the year by a female artist and by a solo artist respectively.

The song went to number one all over Europe, including: Ireland (9 weeks at the top), United Kingdom (7 weeks), Belgium Flanders (5 weeks), Netherlands (4 weeks), Norway (4 weeks) and Sweden (4 weeks). It was the first UK number one single not to be available on vinyl. It was also successful in Australia reaching number two. "Think Twice" was certified Platinum and as of September 2017, it has sold 1,418,966 copies in the UK. It was also certified Platinum in Australia (70,000) and Gold in the Netherlands (50,000) and Belgium (25,000).

A dance version of the song was released by Almighty Records in the 1990s, sung by British singer Rochelle.

Music video
The accompanying music video for "Think Twice" was directed by Randee St. Nicholas. It opens with a shot of Dion lying in bed. She wakes up and starts singing as a car drives up to her house outside. A man (played by the model Steve Santagati), Dion's lover, exits the vehicle and walks up to the front door into the house. He kisses her cheek and as Celine touches him on the shoulder, the man backs away. He lies down on the bed shirtless and sinks his head into the pillow. The camera then shows him looking at the ceiling while Dion sits in the background. The man is later seen carving ice sculptures with a chainsaw. As Celine continues singing, there is a shot of her and her lover apparently arguing. Dion then continues to sing wearing a blue jacket with shots of the man carving ice sculptures. Dion leans against one of the sculptures while her lover lies in bed. He then rises while Celine continues singing. There is then a guitar interlude with shots of the man in his garage and arguing with Dion, before heading out into his car and driving off. He is then seen sitting in a pile of sawdust. Dion continues singing while her lover smashes his ice sculptures. As the video ends, the man walks into the garage and reconciles with Dion. They then embrace and kiss in the sunlight bringing the video to a close.

Live performances
"Think Twice" was performed by Dion during selected dates of her 1994-95 The Colour of My Love Tour, her 1996-97 Falling Into You Around the World Tour, her 1998-99 Let's Talk About Love World Tour and during her 2008-09 Taking Chances World Tour. Dion performed the song also at her 2011-19 Las Vegas residency show Celine between 2017 and 2018. The song was also part of her Live 2017 and Live 2018 tours and was performed as well during Dion's BST Hyde Park concert in London on 5 July 2019.

Track listing and formats

Australian cassette and CD, Canadian cassette, US 7", cassette and CD single
"Think Twice" (Edit) – 4:05
"L'amour existe encore" – 3:50

European CD / UK cassette single
"Think Twice" (Radio Edit) – 4:10
"Le monde est stone" – 3:40

European and UK CD maxi-single
"Think Twice" (Radio Edit) – 4:10
"Le monde est stone" – 3:40
"If Love Is Out the Question" – 3:52
"If You Asked Me To" – 3:53

Japanese CD single
"Think Twice" (Edit) – 4:11
"L'amour existe encore" – 3:51
"(If There Was) Any Other Way" – 4:01

UK cassette and CD single #2
"Think Twice" (Album Version) – 4:45
"The Power of Love" (Album Version) – 5:42
"Where Does My Heart Beat Now" – 4:32

Credits and Personnel 

 Producers – Christopher Neil & Aldo Nova
 Keyboards and Synthesizers – Aldo Nova
 Guitar – Aldo Nova & Tim Renwick
 Bass and Drums – Steve Pigott
 Lead Vocals – Celine Dion
 Backing Vocals – Jackie Rowe & Pam Sayne
 Mastering Engineer – Vlado Meller

Charts

Weekly charts

Year-end charts

Decade-end charts

All-time charts

Certifications and sales

Release history

See also

1994 in British music
1995 in British music
List of best-selling singles of the 1990s in the United Kingdom
List of best-selling singles of the 1900s in the United Kingdom
List of Dutch Top 40 number-one singles of 1995
List of Ivor Novello Award winners
List of million-selling singles in the United Kingdom
List of number-one singles and albums in Sweden
List of number-one singles of 1995 (Ireland)
List of number-one songs in Norway
List of top 25 singles for 1995 in Australia
List of UK Singles Chart number ones of the 1990s
List of UK top-ten singles in 1994
List of UK top-ten singles in 1995
Ultratop 50 number-one hits of 1995

References

External links

1993 songs
1994 singles
1990s ballads
Canadian soft rock songs
Celine Dion songs
Dutch Top 40 number-one singles
Irish Singles Chart number-one singles
Music videos directed by Randee St. Nicholas
Number-one singles in Denmark
Number-one singles in Norway
Number-one singles in Scotland
Number-one singles in Sweden
Pop ballads
Rock ballads
Song recordings produced by Christopher Neil
Songs with lyrics by Peter Sinfield
Songs written by Andy Hill (composer)
UK Singles Chart number-one singles